Jacopo Coppi, also called Giacomo Coppi or  "'Jacopo del Meglio'" ("the Best") (Peretola, 1546  1591) was an Italian painter, mainly active in Florence and Rome in a Mannerist style. Other sources call him Giacinto Coppi.

Biography
He was one of the team of painters under Giorgio Vasari engaged in the decoration of the Studiolo of Francesco I de' Medici in the  Palazzo Vecchio, Florence. For the room, he depicted the Invention of Gunpowder and the Family of Darius before Alexander the Great.

Some of the sources dispute the identity of Coppi and Meglio. He is said to have painted in Rome and Bologna.

Among his works are frescoes (1577) for the tribune of San Pietro in Vincoli in Rome; a painting of Ecce Homo for the church of Santa Croce in Florence, and a canvas of the Redeemer (1579) for the church of San Salvatore in Bologna.

References

1546 births
1591 deaths
16th-century Italian painters
Italian male painters
Painters from Florence
Mannerist painters
Italian Renaissance painters